Good for Me is the third full-length album by Flint, Michigan's The Swellers, and second through label Fueled by Ramen.

Background
In June 2010, the band began writing new material for their next album. The group began recording on February 24 with Descendents drummer Bill Stevenson as producer.

Release
In March and April 2011, the group went on a UK tour alongside the Blackout and Hyro da Hero. On April 22, Good for Me was announced for release in June, revealing its artwork and track listing. In addition, "The Best I Ever Had" was made available for streaming. In April and May, the band participated in the Take Action Tour. On May 19, the group posted footage from the studio. On May 25, a music video was released for "The Best I Ever Had". On June 2, "Nothing More to Me" was made available for streaming. On June 7, Good for Me was made available for streaming via the group's Facebook profile, before being released through Fueled by Ramen on June 14. To promote its release, the group played an in-store acoustic gig. In July and August, the group went on a headlining US tour with support from Fake Problems and Daytrader. Following this, the group went on a tour of Asia with Paramore. In late September and early October, the band toured Australia as part of the Soundwave Counter-Revolution festival. In October and November, the band supported Four Year Strong on the AP Fall Tour. On November 21, Good for Me was released in the UK with bonus track "Never Greener".

In November and December, the band went on a tour of the UK and Europe with support from Broadway Calls and Into It. Over It. In January and February 2012, the group went on a co-headlining US tour with You Me at Six with support from We Are the Ocean and Twin Atlantic. In early February, the group teased a music video for "Inside My Head". On February 29, a video for "Better Things" was posted online featuring footage from the group's European tour. On April 16, the music video for "Inside My Head" was released. In April and May, the group went on a headlining tour of the UK and Europe with support from Deaf Havana. On May 26, the group appeared at Bled Fest. On May 29, a 7" vinyl was released through independent label SideOneDummy Records featuring two outtakes from the album sessions: "Vehicle City Blues" and "Red Lights". In May and June, the band went on tour with The Early November. Following this, the group performed some headlining shows in the US in June, then shows in Canada in July with Living with Lions, Such Gold and Major League. In October, the group performed at The Fest.

Track listing
All songs written by Nick Diener and Jonathan Diener.

Personnel

The Swellers
 Nick Diener – Lead vocals, guitar
 Jonathan Diener – Drums, vocals
 Ryan Collins – Guitar
 Anto Boros – Bass guitar

Artwork
Nick Bilardello – Art Direction, Design
Mitchell Wojcik – Photography

Management
Kenny Czadzeck – Management
David Galea – Booking Agent
Katie Robinson – Marketing

Production
 Bill Stevenson – Producer, engineer
 Jason Livermore – Producer, engineer, mixing
Ted Jensen – Mastering 
Andrew Berlin – Additional Production, engineer
Johnny Minardi & Aryanna Platt – A&Rs

Chart performance

References

2011 albums
The Swellers albums
Fueled by Ramen albums
Albums produced by Bill Stevenson (musician)